The 1997–98 Football League First Division (referred to as the Nationwide First Division for sponsorship reasons) was the sixth season of the league under its current league division format.

Changes from previous season

Team changes

From First Division
Promoted to Premier League
Barnsley
Bolton Wanderers
Crystal Palace

Relegated to Second Division
Grimsby Town
Oldham Athletic
Southend United

To First Division
Promoted from Second Division
Bury
Crewe Alexandra
Stockport County

Relegated from Premier League
Middlesbrough
Nottingham Forest
Sunderland

Teams

Stadium and locations

Personnel and kits

Managerial changes

League table

Play-offs

Results

Season statistics

Top scorers

Hat-tricks

References

 
Eng
Football League First Division seasons
2
1